Krystian Zalewski (born 11 April 1989) is a Polish distance runner specialising in the 3000 metres steeplechase. He won the silver medal at the 2014 European Championships. Additionally, he represented his country at three consecutive World Championships, reaching the final in 2015. He also competed at the 2016 Summer Olympics without qualifying for the final.

Competition record

1Did not start in the final

Personal bests

Outdoor
1000 metres – 2:22.62 (Police 2012)
1500 metres – 3:44.02 (Białogard 2010)
One mile – 4:08.55 (Międzyzdroje 2008)
3000 metres – 7:58.38 (Dessau 2016)
5000 metres – 13:45.94 (Białogard 2015)
5 kilometres – 13:53 (Monaco 2019)
10,000 metres – 28:39.95 (Białogard 2019)
10 kilometres – 30:06 (Warsaw 2018)
Half marathon – 1:02:34 (Gdynia 2019)
3000 metres steeplechase – 8:16.20 (Rome 2014)
Indoor
1500 metres – 3:48.32 (Toruń 2016)
3000 metres – 8:13.43 (Mondeville 2014)

References

1989 births
Living people
Polish male steeplechase runners
People from Drawsko Pomorskie
World Athletics Championships athletes for Poland
Athletes (track and field) at the 2016 Summer Olympics
Olympic athletes of Poland
European Athletics Championships medalists
Sportspeople from West Pomeranian Voivodeship
Universiade medalists in athletics (track and field)
Universiade gold medalists for Poland
Polish Athletics Championships winners
Medalists at the 2017 Summer Universiade